Pasewalk is a railway station  in the town of Pasewalk, Mecklenburg-Vorpommern, Germany. The station lies on the Angermünde–Stralsund railway and the Bützow–Szczecin railway. The train services are operated by Deutsche Bahn.

Train services
The station is served by the following services:

Intercity-Express services (ICE 28) (Binz -) Stralsund - Eberswalde - Berlin - Leipzig - Jena - Nuremberg - Munich (- Innsbruck)
Intercity services (IC 32) Binz - Stralsund - Eberswalde - Berlin - Hanover - Dortmund - Essen - Duisburg - Düsseldorf - Cologne
Regional services  Stralsund - Greifswald - Pasewalk - Angermünde - Berlin - Ludwigsfelde - Jüterbog - Falkenberg - Elsterwerda
Regional services  Lübeck - Bad Kleinen - Güstrow - Neubrandenburg - Pasewalk - Szczecin
Regional services  Bützow - Neubrandenburg - Pasewalk - Ueckermünde Stadthafen

References

Railway stations in Mecklenburg-Western Pomerania
Railway stations in Germany opened in 1863